Isinda may refer to:
Isinda (Ionia), a town of ancient Ionia
Isinda (Lycia), a town of ancient Lycia
Isinda (Pisidia), a city and bishopric of ancient Pisidia